Spawn in computing refers to a function that loads and executes a new child process.
The current process may wait for the child to terminate or may continue to execute concurrent computing. Creating a new subprocess requires enough memory in which both the child process and the current program can execute.

There is a family of spawn functions in DOS, inherited by Microsoft Windows.

There is also a different family of spawn functions in an optional extension of the POSIX standards
.

DOS/Windows spawn functions

The DOS/Windows spawn functions are inspired by Unix functions fork and exec; however, as these operating systems do not support fork, the spawn function was supplied as a replacement for the fork-exec combination. However, the spawn function, although it deals adequately with the most common use cases, lacks the full power of fork-exec, since after fork any process settings which will survive an exec may be changed. However, in most cases, this deficiency can be made up for by using the more low-level CreateProcess API.

In the spawnl, spawnv, and  calls, the child process inherits the environment of the parent.  Files that are open when a spawn call is made remain open in the child process.

Prototype
int spawnl(int mode, char *path, char *arg0, ...);
int spawnle(int mode, char *path, char *arg0, ..., char ** envp);
int spawnlp(int mode, char *path, char *arg0, ...);
int spawnlpe(int mode, char *path, char *arg0, ..., char ** envp);
int spawnv(int mode, char *path, char **argv);
int spawnve(int mode, char *path, char **argv, char ** envp);
int spawnvp(int mode, char *path, char **argv);
int spawnvpe(int mode, char *path, char **argv, char ** envp);

Function names
The base name of each function is spawn, followed by one or more letters:

Mode
The mode argument determines the way the child is run. Values for mode are:

Path
The path argument specifies the filename of the program to execute. For  and  only, if the filename does not have a path and is not in the current directory, the PATH environment variable determines which directories to search for the file. The string pointed to by argv[0] is the name of the program to run.

The command line passed to the spawned program is made up of the character strings, arg0 through , in the spawn call. The accepted maximum combined length of these strings differs between compilers, ranging from 128 characters on Digital Mars to 1024 on Microsoft Visual C++ or
as much as memory permits, on DJGPP. The last argument after  has to be a NULL pointer.

argv
The argv argument is an array of character pointers. The last pointer in the array must be null to indicate the end of the list.

envp
The spawnle, and  calls allow the user to alter the child process's environment by passing a list of environment settings in the  argument. This argument is an array of character pointers; each pointer (except for the last one) points to a null-terminated string defining an environment variable. An environment variable has the form:
 name=value
where name is the variable name and value is its value. The last pointer in the array is null. When the  argument is null, the child inherits the parent's environment settings.

Under Microsoft Windows, the spawn* functions use LoadModule to run the spawned process; and if this fails, an attempt is made to spawn a normal MS-DOS process. If a Windows application is spawned, the instance handle can be obtained using exec_instancehandleget. It is possible to specify how the spawned program will be shown using the functions _exec_showset, _exec_showget, and _exec_showreset.

Return values
The return value indicates the exit status of the spawned program. A value of zero indicates that the spawned program executed successfully. A positive value indicates that the spawned program executed, but was aborted or ended in error, the value returned is the exit status of the child process. A negative value indicates that the spawned program did not execute, and errno is set.
Under Microsoft Windows, spawn returns the negated error code returned from LoadModule for compatibility with the C run-time library. The following error codes may be encountered:

POSIX spawn functions
The  and its sibling posix_spawnp can be used as replacements for fork and exec, but does not provide the same flexibility as using fork and exec separately. They may be efficient replacements for fork and exec, but their purpose is to provide process creation primitives in embedded environments where fork is not supported due to lack of dynamic address translation.

History

The spawn metaphor, i.e., to produce offspring as in egg deposition, had its early use in the VMS, now OpenVMS, operating system (1977). In academia, there existed a lively debate between proponents of the Unix fork (crude copy of memory layout, but fast) versus VMS's spawn (reliable construction of process parameters, but slower). This debate revived when the VMS spawning mechanism was inherited by Windows NT (1993).

See also
Fork
Exec
fork-exec
Path (variable)
Process.h

References

Process (computing)
C POSIX library
Process.h